The International Organisation of Employers (IOE) was created in 1920 to advocate for employers and the business community in the tripartite governance structure of the International Labour Organization (ILO). Today, from its headquarters in Geneva, Switzerland, IOE continues to defend and promote these same interests across a wide range of UN agencies, international organisations, intergovernmental processes and the media. As of September 2019, IOE had 156 national employer organisations members in 145 countries. It remains involved in the activities of the International Labour Organization, acting as Secretariat to the Employers' Group, as well as representing business in international forums, including the G20 intergovernmental process on labour and social policy. It describes itself as "the largest network of the private sector in the world" and "the global voice of business".

History

The International Organisation of Employers was founded in March 1920 in London, where the Governing Body of the International Labour Office had organised a meeting. The original name of the organisation was the International Organisation of Industrial Employers (IOIE). The first member organisations of the IOIE were the Central Industrial Council of Belgium, the General Council of French Manufacturers, the Federation of British Industries, the Italian Confindustria, the Spanish Employers' Organisation, the Latin American Employers' Organisation, and other, more local organisations.

In 1938, IOIE revised its statutes and became the International Organisation of Employers (IOE) to include employers beyond those in the industrial sector. The most recent version of the IOE Statutes dates to 2019 when amendments were adopted by the General Council to reflect evolving circumstances.

Governance

IOE’s governance structure consists of three components: the General Council, composed of all members worldwide; the Management Board, which is elected by and represents members; and the Secretariat in Geneva, at the centre of IOE’s operations. Each has specific roles and responsibilities.

The supreme decision-making body of IOE is the General Council, which brings together delegates from the membership organisations. It meets at least once a year and is responsible for approving the work of the Management Board, which formulates the general policy direction of IOE, adopts a plan of action for the next year and assesses the previous year's work. The Secretariat, the body responsible for the day-to-day running of IOE, is led by the Secretary-General, currently Roberto Suárez Santos, who is accountable to the General Council and the Management Board.

Vision, mission and values

Its vision is to create a sustainable economic environment around the world, in collaboration with members and partners, that promotes free enterprise and is fair and beneficial to both business and society.

Its mission is to serve its members, by fighting and advocating for the interests of employers and business in international policy debates.

Its values are to listen and to argue for its members' views to be taken into account globally. IOE values include open dialogue, action-oriented outcomes and concerted commitment.

Aims

Promote the economic, employment and social policy environment necessary to sustain and develop free enterprise and the market economy.

Provide an international forum to bring together, represent and promote the interests of national business and employers’ organisations and their members throughout the world in all labour and socio-economic policy issues.

Assist, advise, represent and provide relevant services and information to the members of IOE, to establish and maintain permanent contact among them and to coordinate the interests of business and employers at the international level, particularly within the International Labour Organization and other international institutions.

Promote and support the advancement and strengthening of independent and autonomous business and employers’ organisations and to enhance their capabilities and services to members; 
Inform public opinion and promote understanding of employers’ points of view.

Services

To Members:

IOE offers a range of services in support of advocacy, influence and member priorities:
 Advocate for member interests and their affiliates on pressing employment policies in international debates.
 Initiate and manage forums for networking and collaboration among members to empower them to build their capacity as key service providers to their affiliates, and to be effective and influential champions on their behalf.

One-on-one, exclusive services to individual members include:

 a seat at the table at international meetings convened by the ILO and other international organisations;
 technical assistance on social and employment issues;
 support for and solidarity with member organisations in challenging situations;
 capacity-building and training, 
 international recognition.

To companies:

IOE offers a range of corporate networking and learning platforms and venues:

Corporate Partners: Individualised support and services on a range of issues, e.g., human rights and responsible business conduct; participation in global-level discussions in the ILO, other organisations.

GIRN (Global International Relations Network) and GOSH (Global Occupational Safety and Health Network): unique IOE initiatives tailored to the needs of senior professionals; exclusive, confidential forums to discuss critical practice issues with international peers.

GFMD Business Mechanism (Global Forum on Migration and Development): An IOE initiative that aims to mobilise business organisations from around the world to engage on migration issues, raising their awareness of and participation in the work of the GFMD government-led process that explores multilateral approaches to migration and development policies.

GAN (Global Apprenticeships Network): International, CEO-level coalition of businesses, organisations, and employer federations dedicated to creating jobs for youth and skills for business.

Membership organisations

A full list of IOE's membership organisation, which includes 156 national employers' organisations in 145 countries, is available on their website. Any central employers' organisation may join IOE, provided its values are compatible, it is a free and voluntary body, and that its country is a member of the ILO.

References

External links
 Official website

Organizations established in 1920
International business organizations
Organisations based in Geneva
International trade organizations
International organisations based in Switzerland